Udina is an unincorporated community in Elgin and Plato Townships, Kane County, Illinois, United States. It is located mainly at the intersection of Coombs Road, U.S. Route 20 and Plank Road. The Pingree Grove Fire Department is located here.

References

Unincorporated communities in Kane County, Illinois